Nesti is an Italian surname. Notable people with the surname include:

Alice Nesti (born 1989), Italian swimmer
Donald S. Nesti (born 1936), American Roman Catholic priest
Fulvio Nesti (1925–1996), Italian footballer
Mauro Nesti (1935–2013), Italian racing driver
Piergiorgio Nesti (1931–2009), Italian Roman Catholic archbishop

See also
Nestis

Italian-language surnames